This is a list of conflicts in Eritrea arranged chronologically from the early modern period to the present day. This list includes: colonial wars, wars of independence, revolutions, civil wars, riots, massacres, terrorist attacks, and any battles that occurred within the territory of what is today known as the, "State of Eritrea" but were themselves only part of a theater of a world war.

Early modern period

Ottoman Eyalet of Jeddah and Habesh

 1557–1624 Ottoman conquest of Habesh

Late modern period

Italian Eritrea

 1895–1896 First Italo-Ethiopia War
 13 January 1895 Battle of Coatit

Contemporary history

Italian Eritrea

 3 October 1935 – May 1936 Second Italo-Abyssinian War
 3 October 1935 – December 1935 De Bono's invasion of Abyssinia

Italian East Africa

 10 June 1940 – 27 November 1941 World War II
 10 June 1940 – 2 May 1945 Mediterranean and Middle East theatre
 10 June 1940 – 27 November 1941 East African Campaign
 5 February 1941 – 1 April 1941 Battle of Keren

Federation of Ethiopia and Eritrea

 1 September 1961 – 29 May 1991 Eritrean War of Independence
 24 July 1967 – One-hundred-seventy-two men had been killed in Hazemo.
 1967 – Fifty students suspected of being members of the Eritrean Liberation Front (ELF) had been hanged in the center of the town of Agordat.
 17 January 1970 – Sixty village elders in Elabared had been rounded up for supporting the Eritrean Liberation Front and killed.
 30 November 1970 – One-hundred-twenty people in Basik Dera had been rounded up into the local mosque and the mosque's doors had been locked, the building had then been razed and the survivors shot.
 1 December 1970 – Ethiopian Army units had surrounded and killed six-hundred-twenty-five people in Ona, then burnt down the village.
 28 December 1974 – Forty-five students in Asmara had been strangled to death using piano wires, their bodies dumped in alleyways and doorsteps.
 2 February 1975 – During an engagement against both the EPLF and ELF, the Ethiopian Army had attacked the church where eighty to one-hundred-three villagers in Woki Duba had taken refuge.
 14 February 1975 – Shortly after an EPLF attack on two Ethiopian divisions, Ethiopian troops had fired upon and killed somewhere between three-hundred-thirty-one to three-thousand civilians who had been gathered in churches, homes and schools of Asmara and other nearby villages.
 9 March 1975 – After several ELF attacks on the town, the Ethiopian Army had retaliated on the local population by killing two-hundred-eight in Agordat.
 August 1975 – Two-hundred-fifty villagers in Om Hajer had been machine gunned in front of a river to prevent escape. 
 April 1988 – Three killed by aerial attacks in Agordat.
 5 December 1988 – Four-hundred had been killed in She'eb who had been mostly women and children.
 3 April 1990 – 4 April 1990 – Aerial attacks in Afabet had killed sixty-seven and wounded one-hundred-twenty-five.
 24 April 1990 – Aerial attacks and cluster bombs in Massawa had killed fifty and wounded one-hundred-ten.
 1977–1978 Battle of Massawa
 1977 – Siege of Barentu
 17 March 1988 – 20 March 1988 Battle of Afabet
 8 February 1990 – 10 February 1990 Battle of Massawa

Ethiopian Empire

 February 1972 – 13 October 1974 First Eritrean Civil War

Provisional Military Government of Socialist Ethiopia

 February 1980 – 24 March 1981 Second Eritrean Civil War

Transitional Government of Ethiopia

 15 December 1995 – 17 December 1995 Hanish Islands conflict

State of Eritrea

 6 May 1998 – 25 May 2000 Eritrean-Ethiopian War
 10 June 2008 – 13 June 2008 Djiboutian–Eritrean border conflict
 1 January 2010 Eritrean–Ethiopian border skirmish

References

See also

 List of wars involving Eritrea
 Eritrean Defence Forces
 Eritrean Army
 Eritrean Air Force
 Eritrean Navy
 Military history of Africa
 African military systems to 1800 CE
 African military systems 1800 CE — 1900 CE
 African military systems after 1900 CE

Military history of Eritrea
Conflicts